Burmageçit is a village in the Tunceli District, Tunceli Province, Turkey. The village is populated by Kurds of the Kurêşan tribe and had a population of 604 in 2021.

References 

Kurdish settlements in Tunceli Province
Villages in Tunceli District